Minervarya andamanensis, commonly known as the Andaman frog, chestnut-brown frog, or Andaman wart frog is a species of frog only found in the Andaman Islands, India. It has been regarded as a synonym of Limnonectes limnocharis, but is now considered a valid species. A related, unnamed species exists in western Thailand.

References

andamanensis
Frogs of India
Endemic fauna of the Andaman Islands
Amphibians described in 1870
Taxa named by Ferdinand Stoliczka
Taxobox binomials not recognized by IUCN